Flambards Divided (1981) is a sequel to the Flambards trilogy, written by K. M. Peyton.

Synopsis
Flambards Divided continues the story of Christina, who has married Dick, following the death of her first husband, her cousin Will, during World War I. No one approves of Christina's marriage to Dick, because of his poor background, and the family runs into hardship. When Will's older brother, Mark, returns from the war in France, he is badly injured, although still his arrogant old self, and deeply resentful of Dick. Christina finds herself torn between the two and ends by doing what she never believed she would do: falling in love with Mark.

Critical reaction
Many have objected to the way the fourth book reverses the ending of the original trilogy; others have praised it (again sometimes for political reasons). The events in this book do not appear in the television series, which was completed before Flambards Divided was written.

References

1981 British novels
Novels by K. M. Peyton
Oxford University Press books